The Client is a 1994 American legal thriller film directed by Joel Schumacher, and starring Susan Sarandon, Tommy Lee Jones, Brad Renfro (his acting film debut), Mary-Louise Parker, Anthony LaPaglia, Anthony Edwards, and Ossie Davis. It is based on the 1993 novel by John Grisham. It was filmed in Memphis, Tennessee.

The Client was theatrically released in the United States on July 20, 1994 and was a box-office hit, grossing $117.6 million against a $45 million budget. It received positive reviews from critics, with Sarandon's, Jones's and Renfro's performance in particular earning high praise.

Plot 
Eleven-year-old Mark Sway and his little brother, Ricky, are smoking cigarettes in the woods near their home when they encounter mob lawyer W. Jerome Clifford. Clifford tells Mark that he is about to kill himself to avoid being murdered by Barry "The Blade" Muldano, the nephew of notorious mob kingpin Johnny Sulari. Ricky becomes catatonic after witnessing the suicide and is hospitalized at Saint Peter Charity Hospital. Authorities – and the mob – realize that Clifford probably told Mark where a Louisiana senator Boyd Boyette, murdered by Muldano, is buried.

Mark meets Regina "Reggie" Love, a lawyer and recovering alcoholic, who agrees to represent him. They quickly run afoul of "Reverend" Roy Foltrigg, a celebrated and vain US Attorney who is using the case as a springboard for his political ambitions. In the meantime, it is revealed that Sulari never authorized Muldano to kill the senator and wants Muldano to uncover how much the boys know. Muldano is also ordered to move the body, but he is unable to because it is buried in Clifford's boathouse, and police are still on the property investigating his suicide.

Foltrigg continues to use legal means to get Mark to reveal where the body is hidden, while Sulari orders Muldano to kill the children and Reggie. He also orders the body to be moved once the investigation at Clifford's home is concluded. Mark is threatened in a hospital elevator by Mafia member Paul Gronke, and is unable to talk to Foltrigg.

Mark and Reggie go to New Orleans to confirm that the body is on Clifford's property. Reggie intends to use this information to broker a deal with Foltrigg to get Ricky specialized medical care and place the family in the witness protection program. Reggie and Mark arrive at Clifford's house the same night as Muldano and his accomplices. They are digging up the body, but a melee follows when Mark and Reggie are discovered. Muldano and the others flee after Reggie trips the neighbors' alarm.

Foltrigg agrees to Reggie's demands in exchange for information about the body's location. Before the Sway family leaves to restart their lives under new identities, Mark and Reggie share a heartfelt goodbye. While Muldano gets angry at his fellow mob members for messing up, Sulari becomes fed up with Muldano and sends him off to be killed. With the body recovered, Foltrigg is a lock-in for the media headlines he craves, and mentions that he intends to run for governor.

Cast

Reception

Box office 
The Client was a financial success, earning $92,115,211 at the North American domestic box office and an additional $25,500,000 internationally, for a worldwide total of $117,615,211.

Critical response 
The Client received generally positive reviews. Rotten Tomatoes gave the film a score of 80% from 40 reviews. The site's consensus states: "The Client may not reinvent the tenets of the legal drama, but Joel Schumacher's sturdy directorial hand and a high-caliber cast bring John Grisham's page-turner to life with engrossing suspense." Audiences surveyed by CinemaScore gave the film a grade of "B+" on scale of A+ to F.

Roger Ebert gave the film two and a half out of four stars and The New York Times called The Client a film "with a fast, no-nonsense pace and three winning performances...that most clearly echoes the simple, vigorous Grisham style"; while the non-profit group Common Sense Media warned "that threats of violence and death, often directed against an 11-year-old boy, are constant here."

Year-end lists 
 4th  – Mack Bates, The Milwaukee Journal

Awards and honors 

For her work in the film, Sarandon was nominated for an Academy Award for Best Actress and won a BAFTA Award for Best Actress in a Leading Role. For his work in the film, Renfro won for an Young Artist Awards for Best Performance by a Young Actor Starring in a Motion Picture and was nominated for a Chicago Film Critics Association for Most Promising Actor.

Home media
The film was released in DVD on December 17, 1997 and also in Blu-Ray on November 6, 2012.

Adaptations 

The film spawned a TV series of the same name, starring JoBeth Williams and John Heard, while Ossie Davis reprises his role of Judge Harry Roosevelt. The show lasted one season (1995–1996).

See also 
 Trial film

Notes 
 a.  Spelled "Muldanno" in the original novel.

References

External links 
 
 
 

1994 films
1994 crime thriller films
1990s legal films
American crime thriller films
American legal drama films
1990s English-language films
Legal thriller films
American courtroom films
BAFTA winners (films)
Films based on works by John Grisham
Films directed by Joel Schumacher
Films set in Tennessee
Films shot in Mississippi
Films shot in New Orleans
Regency Enterprises films
Warner Bros. films
Films scored by Howard Shore
Films set in Memphis, Tennessee
Films with screenplays by Akiva Goldsman
Films about lawyers
Films shot in Tennessee
Films about mother–son relationships
Films produced by Arnon Milchan
Films about witness protection
1990s American films
Films with screenplays by Robert Getchell